The Ceylon Armed Services Inauguration Medal was awarded to members of the Ceylon armed services who served within their specific service branch during periods in 1949-1951 when their service branch was established:
Ceylon Army (10 October 1949)
Royal Ceylon Navy (9 December 1950)
Royal Ceylon Air Force (2 March 1951).

References

Army, Sri Lanka. (1st Edition - October 1999). "50 YEARS ON" - 1949-1999, Sri Lanka Army.

External links
Sri Lanka Army
Sri Lanka Navy
Sri Lanka Air Force
Ministry of Defence : Sri Lanka

Military awards and decorations of Sri Lanka
Awards established in 1955
1955 establishments in Ceylon